Malin Ewerlöf-Krepp (born 2 June 1972 in Gävle) is retired Swedish athlete who competed in the middle-distance events. She represented her country at the 1996 Summer Olympics in both 800 and 1500 metres, reaching semifinals in the latter. She won the 800 metres silver medal at the 1998 European Championships.

Competition record

Personal bests
Outdoor
800 metres – 1:59.44 (Budapest 1998)
1000 metres – 2:41.72 (Stockholm 1995)
1500 metres – 4:05.49 (Luzern 1997)
One mile – 4:25.34 (Bellinzona 1997) NR
3000 metres – 9:23.37 (Sudbury 1988)
Marathon – 2:44:38 (Stockholm 2005)

Indoor
800 metres – 2:01.31 (Stockholm 1997)
1000 metres – 2:38.11 (Stockholm 1999) NR
1500 metres – 4:09.72 (Paris 1997)

References

External links
Personal website

1972 births
Living people
Swedish female middle-distance runners
People from Gävle
Athletes (track and field) at the 1996 Summer Olympics
Olympic athletes of Sweden
Sportspeople from Gävleborg County